Khoey Ho Tum Kahan (Urdu: کهوے هو توم کهاں ) is a 2001 Pakistani Urdu film directed by Ajab Gul. The film starred Babar Ali, Ajab Gul and Meera. It earned 5 Nigar Awards, and performed well at the box office.

Synopsis
It is a suspense thriller with a tilt on Meera character's issues.

Soundtrack
The music is composed by Zain.

Awards

References

External links
 Khoey Ho Tum Kahan - IMDB.com

2001 films
Pakistani thriller drama films
2000s Urdu-language films
Nigar Award winners
2001 directorial debut films
Urdu-language Pakistani films